This is a select list of recordings of Der Rosenkavalier, a three-act opera by Richard Strauss with a German-language libretto by Hugo von Hofmannsthal. The work was first performed at the Königliches Opernhaus in Dresden on 26 January 1911 under the direction of Max Reinhardt.

Audio

Video

References
Notes

Sources
 
Discography, Schott Music, accessed 2 February 2010

Opera discographies
Operas by Richard Strauss